Saw Taw Oo was a queen consort of King Swa Saw Ke of Ava. She was the daughter of King Thihapate of Sagaing, a granddaughter of King Saw Yun, the founder of Sagaing, and a half-sister of King Thado Minbya, the founder of Ava. She was raised to be a queen of Swa Saw Ke with the title of Queen of the Central Palace, succeeding her half-sister Saw Omma. The queen was also given Pagan (Bagan) in fief.

Ancestry
The following is her ancestry according to Hmannan. She was descended from Pagan and Pinya royalty. Her father's lineage is not reported except that he was not of royal blood and that he was a grandnephew of Queen Pwa Saw of Pagan.

References

Bibliography
 

Queens consort of Ava
14th-century Burmese women